Shakespeare by the Sea is a nonprofit organization that was launched in 1998  by Producing Artistic Director Lisa Coffi. Shakespeare by the Sea offers a free repertory season that runs for ten weeks throughout Los Angeles and Orange County. All performances are admission free. Each summer, the company tours about 20 cities for as many as 40 performances.

Over the years, Shakespeare by the Sea has developed into a mid-sized arts organization with two core programs: the free summer repertory presented in San Pedro and then throughout the South Bay, Los Angeles and Orange County; and the Little Fish Theatre, a 60-seat black box theatre producing new, classic and contemporary works year-round in the downtown San Pedro Arts District.

Shakespeare by the Sea is supported by a combination of individual donations, government and arts program grants and corporate sponsorship.

Founding members of Shakespeare by the Sea are Lisa Coffi, Stephanie Courtney and Keith Gotowicki.  The organization is currently run by Lisa Coffi as Producing Artistic Director and Suzanne Dean as Development Director.

Shakespeare by the Sea, Los Angeles is listed as a Major Festival in the book Shakespeare Festivals Around the World by Marcus D. Gregio (Editor), 2004.

Past performances 
 2022 Much Ado About Nothing and Romeo and Juliet
 2021 Love's Labour's Lost and Richard III
 2020 Titus Andronicus- streamed on YouTube
 2019 The Comedy of Errors and Henry V 
 2018 The Merry Wives of Windsor and The Winter's Tale
 2017 Taming of the Shrew and Macbeth 
 2016 Othello and Cymbeline
 2015 As You Like It and The Tempest
 2014 Midsummer Night's Dream and Hamlet
 2013 All's Well that Ends Well and King John
 2012 Romeo and Juliet and Two Gentlemen of Verona
 2011 King Lear and Much Ado About Nothing
 2010 Julius Caesar and Twelfth Night
 2009 As You Like It and Love's Labour's Lost
 2008 A Midsummer Night's Dream and Antony and Cleopatra
 2007 Taming of the Shrew and The Merchant of Venice
 2006 The Comedy of Errors and Hamlet
 2005 The Merry Wives of Windsor and Othello
 2004 Richard III and The Two Gentlemen of Verona
 2003 Twelfth Night and Romeo and Juliet
 2002 Much Ado About Nothing and Macbeth
 2001 As You Like It and  The Tempest
 2000 A Midsummer Night's Dream
 1999 The Taming of the Shrew
 1998 The Comedy of Errors

References 

 Ng, David. "Shakespeare in the Sun" Los Angeles Times June 26, 2008
 Deioma, Kayte "Summer Means Shakespeare in Southern California" About.com Los Angeles Travel Blog, July 14, 2006
 Ip, Hoiyin. "Pageant of the Masters Ticketing Torture" City Committee, August 5, 2008
 Gottlieb, Shirle. "Escabana in da Moonlight - A Review" Stage Happenings Online
 Farrell, John "Hay Fever" is blissfully brisk and breezy The Daily Breeze April 21, 2009
 Haupt, Molly "Betrayal" and Blind Love Coast Gopher Harbor Area News, April 24, 2009

External links 
 Official Website

Shakespearean theatre companies
Shakespeare festivals in the United States
Theatre companies in Los Angeles
South Bay, Los Angeles
Organizations established in 1998
1998 establishments in California